Gonypeta is an Asian genus of praying mantids: in the subfamily Gonypetinae.

Species
The Mantodea Species File lists:
 Gonypeta borneana Giglio-Tos, 1915
 Gonypeta brigittae Kaltenbach, 1994
 Gonypeta brunneri Giglio-Tos, 1915
 Gonypeta humbertiana Saussure, 1869
 Gonypeta noctivaga Krauss, 1901
 Gonypeta punctata Haan, 1842 - type species
 Gonypeta rotundata Beier, 1966
 Gonypeta simplex Beier, 1930

References

External links 

Mantodea genera
Gonypetidae